Concrete and Glass is the second studio album by French musician Nicolas Godin. It was released on 24 January 2020 through Because Music.

The first single from the album, "The Border" was released on October 12, 2019. The second single "The Foundation" was released on 28 November 2019. The third single "Catch Yourself Falling" was released on March 11, 2020.

Critical reception
Concrete and Glass was met with generally favorable reviews from critics. At Metacritic, which assigns a weighted average rating out of 100 to reviews from mainstream publications, this release received an average score of 71, based on 7 reviews.

Track listing

Charts

See also
List of 2020 albums

References

2020 albums